A construction soldier (BS) was a non-combat role of the National People's Army, the armed forces of the German Democratic Republic (East Germany), from 1964 to 1990. Bausoldaten were conscientious objectors who accepted conscription but refused armed service and instead served in unarmed construction units. Bausoldaten were the only legal form of conscientious objection in the Warsaw Pact.

History

Background
Before the construction of the Berlin Wall in August 1961, military service in the German Democratic Republic (GDR or East Germany) was entirely voluntary, though intensive recruitment drives were mounted by public schools and the Free German Youth, and service was often a prerequisite for future career advancement. The Federal Republic of Germany (West Germany) had introduced conscription in 1956, one year after the Bundeswehr was established, to maximise military strength for the potential World War III during the Cold War. The GDR authorities were reluctant to introduce conscription, partly because they feared that it would increase the already large number of citizens legally migrating to West Germany, known as Republikflucht. However, the Berlin Wall's construction led to a rapid drop in emigration from the GDR (now effectively illegal) with the number decreasing from hundreds of thousands per year to only hundreds per year.

Creation
On 24 January 1962, East Germany introduced conscription, with all males aged 18 to 60 required to serve 18-months in the National People's Army (NVA). The decision was met by strong resistance from Christian churches in the GDR, who rejected military conscription as there were no alternatives for conscientious objectors who refused armed service on pacifist grounds. When over 1,000 East German men refused mandatory military service and were subsequently arrested in 1962 and 1963, the GDR authorities came under pressure to provide an alternative to armed service. In 1964, Emil Fuchs, a prominent member of the pacifists, managed to negotiate a deal with the East German government allowing conscientious objectors to be able to serve their conscription in non-combat roles, becoming the only Warsaw Pact country to allow this. The National Defense Council of East Germany authorised the formation of Baueinheiten (construction units) for men of draft age who "refuse military service with weapons on the grounds of religious viewpoints or for similar reasons". The Baueinheiten were seen as a victory for East German conscientious objectors, but in reality their creation was a planned move by the government to segregate them from regular conscripts, who they feared would be contaminated by pacifist ideas. Additionally, the Bausoldaten provided the GDR with a large source of cheap labor in a country plagued with chronic labor shortages.

Service conditions
The Bausoldaten or "construction soldiers" wore uniforms, lived in barracks under military discipline, and had to serve for the mandatory 18 months like regular soldiers, but were not required to bear arms and received no combat training. They were nicknamed "Spatensoldaten" or "Spati", an abbreviation of the German word for a spade, which was shown on their uniforms. In theory, Bausoldaten were to be used only for civilian construction projects, but they were used to build military installations until 1973 when churches began protesting their usage. Instead, they received relatively "civilian" tasks in military institutions such as repairing tanks and military equipment, gardeners, nurses in military hospitals, or in kitchens. During the later years of the GDR, many construction soldiers also worked in large state-owned companies suffering from labor shortages, for example in the chemical industry or in lignite mines. Though outwardly peaceful in appearance, soldiers in Baueinheiten were obliged to make a promise of loyalty in which they stated that they would "fight against all enemies and obey their superiors unconditionally", though this was replaced by an oath to "increase defence readiness" in the 1980s. The demand for Baueinheiten grew shortly after their founding as workers were needed for labour in construction projects, and in 1966 four more battalions were set up. Prora on the island of Rügen became the largest concentration of Bausoldat, housing over 500 men for the construction of the Mukran ferry port in Sassnitz. In 1968, the demand for Baueinheiten grew rapidly following the GDR government's tacit support for the Warsaw Pact invasion of Czechoslovakia, which appalled many young East German men and led to a surge of conscientious objection.

Service in the Baueinheiten, although legal, was deliberately stigmatized, both for ideological reasons and to discourage conscripts from trying to avoid armed service in the "easier" construction units. Originally, the Baueinheiten were stylized as penal military units with names such as Arbeitskompanien ("Labor company") and Arbeitsbataillone ("Labor battalion"), but this styling was dropped when it was considered to be similar to the Strafkompanie of the Nazi concentration camps. The GDR viewed conscientious objectors as potential enemies of the state, and after the completion of mandatory service, former Bausoldaten were actively discriminated against in the state apparatus. A record of service as a construction soldier could lead to the denial of opportunities in employment, career advancement, and the state higher education system. In the 1970s, GDR leaders acknowledged that former construction soldiers were at a disadvantage when they rejoined the civilian sphere. In 1984, General Secretary Erich Honecker and Defence Minister Army General Heinz Hoffmann asserted that Bausoldaten no longer suffered such discrimination; like others who had completed their military service, they were given preference in the university admission process.

Dissolution
In the 1980s, the gradual decline of the GDR led to increasing resistance to mandatory military service, even in the Baueinheiten, from the growing pacifist movement and opposition to the ruling Socialist Unity Party of Germany (SED). Many serving Bausoldaten belonged to the opposition movement, while the youth in East Germany began to increasingly demand for an alternative civilian service.  

On 1 January 1990, the Baueinheiten were dissolved and 1,500 construction soldiers released, while the remaining members were released from the NVA at the beginning of October 1990, days before the GDR's dissolution and German reunification. The dissolution of the Baueinheiten was a deliberate political act under the government Lothar de Maizière, the only non-SED and democratically elected prime minister of the GDR, occurring just over a month after the Fall of the Berlin Wall on 9 November 1989.

Notable former construction soldiers 
 Rudolf Albrecht – Protestant minister and representative of the Church's peace movement in the GDR
 Andreas Amende  Member of the Bundestag
 Christfried Berger – Protestant theologian in the GDR in the field of ecumenism
 Wolfgang Birthler – veterinarian; Brandenburg State Minister of Agriculture, Environment and Spatial Planning (1999-2004)
 Martin Böttger – physicist, civil rights activist and politician, 1990–1994 Member of the Saxon State Parliament,  2001–2010 Head of the Chemnitz office of the BStU, the federal agency of Germany that preserves and protects the archives and investigates the past actions of the former Stasi
 Harald Bretschneider – Protestant minister and representatives of the ecclesiastical peace, environmental and human rights movement in the GDR
 Stephan Dorgerloh – theologian and politician, Saxony-Anhalt State Minister of Education
 Bernd Eisenfeld – historian and GDR opposition figure
 Rainer Eppelmann – minister and politician (the only Minister of the Ministry of Disarmament and Defense of the GDR)
 Gunter Fritsch – politician; Brandenburg State Minister of Food, Agriculture and Forestry. President of the Brandenburg State Parliament
 Andreas Grapatin – politician, member of the Saxony State Parliament
 Frank Hempel – politician
 Ralf Hirsch – GDR dissident and human rights activist
 Günter Holwas – blues musician
 Johann-Georg Jaeger – politician (Alliance '90 / The Greens), MP
 Karl-August Kamilli – politician, Deputy Chairman of the SPD
 John Kimme – lawyer
 Thomas Kretschmer – civil rights activist and a political prisoner in East Germany
 Hendrik Liersch – publisher of the Corvinus Press
 Heiko Lietz –  civil rights activist, former politician (New Forum, Alliance '90 / The Greens)
 Frank-Wolf Matthies – writer
 Gerhard Miesterfeldt – politician, Vice President of the State Parliament of Saxony-Anhalt
 Martin Morgner – poet, playwright and historian
 Andreas Otto – politician (The Greens)
 Bert Papenfuß-Gorek – poet
 Gerd Poppe – physicist, civil rights activist and politician; Human Rights Commissioner of the Federal Government (1998–2003)
 Jürgen Rennert – writer
 Frank Richter – theologian, founder of the Group of 20 in Dresden, director of the Saxon State Agency for Civic Education
 Gerhard Schöne – songwriter
 Reinhard Schult – civil and political activist and leader
 Werner Schulz – civil rights activist and politician, Member of the Bundestag
 Georg Seidel – playwright
 Wolfgang Tiefensee – 1998–2005 Lord Mayor of Leipzig ; 2005–2009 Federal Minister of Transport, Building and Urban Development
 Mathias Tietke – journalist and author
 Rudolf Tschäpe – astrophysicist and civil rights activist
 Nicholas Voss – political official
 Gunter Weißgerber – politician
 Ingo Zimmermann – journalist and art historian

See also 
 Conscientious objection in East Germany
 Sozialer Friedensdienst
 Reich Labour Service

External links

Conscientious objection
East German law
Military of East Germany
Non-combatant military personnel
Unfree labour